McDaniel Robinson (July 17, 1926 – February 11, 2022) was a Democratic member of the North Carolina Senate from 1999 to 2002 representing District 29. He was defeated by fellow Sen. Bob Carpenter of the Republican Party after redistricting.

Robinson was born in Marion, North Carolina in 1926. He went to Western Carolina University, graduating with a Bachelor of Science. 
He served as a member of the US Navy in World War II. Robinson started his political career late by winning election in 1998.

Robinson died on February 11, 2022.

References

Carroll's State Directory. Carroll Publishing, 2006 accessed through Biography Resource Centre May 21, 2006.

External links

1926 births
2022 deaths
North Carolina state senators
People from Marion, North Carolina
21st-century American politicians

nl:Dan Robinson